Eremalche exilis is a species of flowering plant in the mallow family known as white mallow or desert mallow. It is native to Baja California, Mexico and the southwestern United States where it grows in desert and other dry scrub habitats.

Description
It is an annual herb growing mostly decumbent along the ground with hairy stems approaching  in maximum length. The fruit is disc divided into up to 13 segments. It flowers in the late winter to spring.

References

Malveae
Flora of the Southwestern United States
Flora of Baja California